Alniaria is a genus of flowering plants in the family Rosaceae, native to China, Taiwan, Korea, Japan, and Far Eastern Russia. It was split off from Sorbus (sensu lato) in 2018.

Species
The following species are accepted:
Alniaria alnifolia (Siebold & Zucc.) Rushforth
Alniaria chengii (C.J.Qi) Rushforth
Alniaria folgneri (C.K.Schneid.) Rushforth
Alniaria hunanica (C.J.Qi) Rushforth
Alniaria nubium (Hand.-Mazz.) Rushforth
Alniaria tsinlingensis (C.L.Tang) Rushforth
Alniaria yuana (Spongberg) Rushforth

References

 
Maleae
Rosaceae genera
Flora of South-Central China
Flora of Southeast China
Flora of North-Central China
Flora of Manchuria
Flora of Taiwan
Flora of Korea
Flora of Primorsky Krai
Flora of Japan